The Interlock System is R. Talsorian Games' proprietary role-playing system.

History
Interlock was a game system by R. Talsorian Games based on a simple system of adding a bonus to a roll on a 10-sided die. Mekton II (1987) – the third edition of R. Talsorian's mecha game – was the first game to use the full-fledged Interlock system, and featured point-based characters with a character background system adapted from the original Mekton, though in a more complex and comprehensive form called Lifepaths. Cyberpunk 2013 (1988) was the second design to feature R. Talsorian's Interlock system. Cyberpunk introduced a new combat system to the original Interlock system called "Friday Night Firefight", while the second edition of the game, Cyberpunk 2020 (1990), made further improvements on the Interlock system resulting in what is now known as "Standard Interlock".

Interlock is one of the direct parents of the Fuzion system (the other is the Hero System).  The Interlock System is "skill-based"—characters are created by choosing skills for them, and by advancing those skills individually, rather than by choosing character class packages.  The Interlock System is used primarily in the Cyberpunk 2020 and Mekton role-playing games. A variant of the Interlock System is used in Teenagers from Outer Space and the Japanese Gundam Senki RPG.

System
Stats and skills are both rated on a scale of 0-10 with 0 representing no ability/no training and 10 representing the maximum ability possible for a human being.  A typical skill roll will range from 12-20 for most tasks, so a skill 10 + stat 10 will succeed at virtually any task barring a critical mishap, while a skill 0 + stat 2 (minimum statistic level for a human character) will fail at any but the very simplest task, and even then will succeed only on a critical success.  Interlock builds on the typical skill-based paradigm by offering "template" (Mekton) or "profession" (Cyberpunk) packages that give specialized abilities to characters that take these packages.

There are nine Attributes: Intelligence (INT), Reflexes (REF), Cool (COOL), Technical Ability (TECH), Luck (LUCK), Attractiveness (ATT), Movement (MOVE), Empathy (EMP), and Body (BOD). Characters must have a starting Attribute stat minimum of 2 and a system stat maximum of 10. 

In Cyberpunk and Cybergeneration Empathy is very important. It not only controls interpersonal interactions but it also determines how much cyberware you can install. Every piece of cyberware has a Humanity Cost that reduces the character's base Empathy. A rating of "0" or less means the character has become psychotic and can no longer be played.

The Interlock System is best known for its Lifepath system, a storytelling device used to create character backgrounds without particular direct benefit or drawback to the character, avoiding min-maxing.

See also
 Fuzion
 Mekton

References

Role-playing game systems